The John F. Seagle Building (also known as Hotel Kelley or the Dixie Hotel) is a historic building located at 408 West University Avenue in Gainesville, Florida, in the United States. Built in 1926, it was designed by noted University of Florida architect and professor Rudolph Weaver and built by G. Lloyd Preacher & Company.

On August 16, 1982, it was added to the National Register of Historic Places as the Dixie Hotel, Hotel Kelley.

History
The Seagle Building had its origins in the 1920s economic boom, especially the Florida land boom of the 1920s. Conceived originally as the "Hotel Kelly," the project went bust before the last floor was poured. It sat unfinished for over a decade and was considered an eyesore. In the mid-1930s a Jacksonville entrepreneur, Georgia Seagle finally finished the building, with assistance from the University of Florida, the city of Gainesville, and federal funding. Seagle gave the building to the University of Florida and asked that it be named after her  deceased brother, John F. Seagle.

The building served mostly the University of Florida in the years following its completion. Having difficulty meeting modern fire codes as time passed, the building lost most of its upper-floor tenants. By the late 1960s, the Florida State Museum was the building's only occupant. When that museum moved to the UF campus nearby, the building was completely abandoned.

Eventually sold to a development company from Kentucky for $1 with the understanding that the building was to be completely renovated, a newly remodeled Seagle Building reopened in 1983 with modern wiring, plumbing, telephone and cable jacks, a fire sprinkler system, an emergency diesel generator, an added internal concrete stairway providing two fire escapes for every floor, and many other improvements. The remaining five floors are residential units, with four units per floor with the exception of the top floor, which is a single unit.

See also
University of Florida
Buildings at the University of Florida

References

External links

Official website
 Alachua County listings at National Register of Historic Places
 Alachua County listings at Florida's Office of Cultural and Historical Programs
 Virtual tour of Downtown Gainesville and Related Structures at Alachua County's Department of Growth Management
 The Seagle Building has storied history at The Gainesville Sun
 Dixie Motel at Alachua County Library District Heritage Collection

Buildings and structures in Gainesville, Florida
National Register of Historic Places in Gainesville, Florida
Rudolph Weaver buildings
G. Lloyd Preacher buildings
1926 establishments in Florida